Ballari Cantonment railway station (station code: BYC) is a second railway station in Ballari, Karnataka for local passenger trains only. It serves Ballari city. The station consists of two platforms, neither well sheltered. It lacks many facilities including water and sanitation. it is situated in the Bellary cantonment.

References

Railway stations in Bellary district
Hubli railway division